Muddy Creek is a  long 4th order tributary to the Deep River in Guilford and Randolph Counties, North Carolina.

Course
Muddy Creek rises on the east side of Archdale, North Carolina in Guilford County and then flows southeast into Randolph County to join the Deep River about 1.5 miles northwest of Randleman, North Carolina.

Watershed
Muddy Creek drains  of area, receives about 46.3 in/year of precipitation, and has a wetness index of 418.90 and is about 24% forested.

References

Rivers of North Carolina
Rivers of Guilford County, North Carolina
Rivers of Randolph County, North Carolina